The term Cambridge Ring could refer to:

 The Cambridge Ring (computer network) technology developed at the university of Cambridge, England
 The Cambridge Five espionage ring.
 The inner ring-road of Cambridge, England. Made up of A1134, Gonville Place, and East Road.